Dedalus Books is a British publishing company specialising in European literature.  As stated on their website, Dedalus specialises in "its own distinctive genre, which we term distorted reality, where the bizarre, the unusual and the grotesque and the surreal meld in a kind of intellectual fiction which is very European."

Established by  Geoffrey Smith, Eric Lane and Robert Irwin, Dedalus was launched on 30 November 1983 with the publication of three novels including Irwin's The Arabian Nightmare and Smith's vampire novel The Revenants (bylined "Geoffrey Farrington"). Dedalus publishes novels and anthologies, featuring both contemporary and historical European works.  Dedalus publishes both translations and original English language works. Dedalus brought a number of European writers such as Sylvie Germain and Herbert Rosendorfer into English for the first time, and also published numerous anthologies of fantastic literature, such as 
The Dedalus Book  of Polish Fantasy (1996) edited by Wiesiek Powaga.
Michael Dirda has praised Dedalus' output, describing them as "the premier publisher of 
decadent, turn-of-the-last--century European fiction" and stating "there are superb Dedalus anthologies of Portuguese
and Polish fantasy".

Dedalus is partially funded by the Arts Council of England. Dedalus Books ought not to be confused with the Irish imprint, Dedalus Press (founded 1985) which publishes contemporary Irish poetry and poetry from around the world in English translation.

References

External links
Dedalus Books homepage

Book publishing companies of the United Kingdom